Skull Run is an unincorporated community in Jackson County, West Virginia, United States. Their Post Office   no longer is in service.

The community takes its name from nearby Skull Run creek.

References 

Unincorporated communities in West Virginia
Unincorporated communities in Jackson County, West Virginia